No. 163 Squadron RAF was a Royal Air Force Squadron that was a communications and light bomber unit in World War II.

History

Formation and World War I
No. 163 Squadron Royal Flying Corps was formed on 1 June 1918, but it was not equipped with any aircraft and was disbanded on 17 August 1918 without becoming operational.

Reformation in World War II

The squadron reformed on 10 July 1942 at Asmara, Egypt, and equipped with Hudson aircraft that operated a mail and communications service to Khartoum, Sudan, and other African countries. It was disbanded on 16 June 1943 and reformed at RAF Wyton on 15 January 1945 as a Mosquito Squadron on operations over Germany as part of the Night Striking Force, it finally disbanded on 10 August 1945.

Aircraft operated

References

External links
 History of No.'s 161–165 Squadrons at RAF Web
 163 Squadron history on the official RAF website
 163 Squadron and KB476 raid on Berlin March 13th 1945

163
Military units and formations established in 1918
1918 establishments in the United Kingdom